A Pattavali (From Sanskrit patta: seat, avali: chain), Sthaviravali or Theravali, is a record of a spiritual lineage of heads of monastic orders.  They are thus spiritual genealogies. It is generally presumed that two successive names are teacher and pupil. The term is applicable for all Indian religions, but is generally used for Jain monastic orders.

There are several famous pattavalis which are often used to establish historical chronologies:

Sarasvatigachchha Pattavali: Pattavali of the Balatkara Gana of Mula Sangh
Tapagaccha Pattavali: Pattavali of Tapa Gachchha
Upakesha Gaccha Pattavali: Pattavali of  now extinct Upakesha Gaccha. 
Kharataragachha Pattavali: Pattavali of Kharatara Gachchha

Glasenapp notes that although the chronological list mentioned in pattavali are valuable, it is not reliable.

Description
Pattavali states the lineage of Jain monks.

The Jain Monastic Lineages
According to 600 AD inscription at Sravanabelagola, Harivansha Purana, Jambuddvita Pannati and Kalpasutra, the Pattavali (lineage) after Mahavira, 24th tirthankara, is traced as follows. Bhadrabahu was the last leader of the undivided Sangha. After him there were two branches in the lineage. In both branches, some of the oral tradition was gradually lost. The two branches eventually became the two traditions Digambaras and the Svetambaras, although formal recognition of the separation is encountered in the 5th century CE. Kalpasutra gives a lineage starting with Pushyagiri after Vajrasena ending with Kshamashramna Devarddhi, the president of the Vallabhi council. The canonical books of the Svetambaras were produced in writing in this Council. The Kalpasutra also mentions  ganas and shakhas established by other disciples of Bhadrabahu, Sambhutavijaya, Mahagiri etc. The Brihat-Kharataragachchha pattavali gives the name of Chandra after Vajrasena, the lineage continues until Udyotana, the founder of Brihadgachcha.

The Kevalis (those who attained kavalagyana)
Mahavira Swami
Gautam Swami
Sudharmaswami (Lohacharya)
Jambu Swami
The Shruta Kevalis (who knew the complete oral texts) According to Digambara tradition:
Vishnudeva
Aparajita
Govardhana
Bhadrabahu
The Shruta Kevalis (who knew the complete oral texts) According to Svetambara tradition:
Prabhava
Sayyambhava
Yashobhadra
Sambhutavijaya
Bhadrabahu

The Lineages after Bhadrabahu
According to Digambar tradition, the monastic lineage after bhadrabahu was:

Bhadrabahu, the shruta-kevali
Visakha, the 10-purvis begin here
Prosthila
Kshatria
Jayasena
Nagasena
Siddhartha
Dhritisena
Vijaya
Buddhilinga
Deva I
Dharasena
Nakshatri, 11 angis begin here.
Jayapalaka
Pandava
Dhruvasena
Kansa
Subhadra, 1 angis begins here.
Yashobhadra
Bhadrabahu II
Lohacarya II
Arhadvali, ekangis with partial knowledge of one anga.
Maghanandi
Dharasena, see Satkhandagama
Pushpadanta
Bhutabali

Arhadvali is said to have been the founder  for the divisions of the Mula Sangha.

The lineage from Bhadrabahu according to Svetambara tradition is:
Bhadrabahu and Sambhutavijaya
Sthulabhadra
Mahagiri (268 BC to 168 BC) and Suhastin (222 BC to 122 BC)
Susthita
Indradatta
Dinna
Sinhagiri
Vajra (31 BC to 47 CE)
Vajrasena

According to Shwetambar tradition, the monastic lineage is

 Sudharmaswami
Jambu Swami
Prabhava
Sayyambhava
Yashobhadra
Sambhutavijaya & Bhadrabahu
Sthulabhadra  
Mahagiri (268 BC to 168 BC) and Suhastin (222 BC to 122 BC)
Susthita and Supratibuddh
Indradinna 
Dinna
Sinhagiri
Vajraswami (31 BC to 47 CE) 
Vajrasena
Chandrasuri
-
Vriddhadeva 
Pradyotansuri
Mandevsuri
Mantungsuri
Virsuri
Jaidevsuri
Anandsuri
Vikramsuri
Narsimhsuriji 
Samudrasuri
Mandevsuri II
Vibudhprabhasuri 
Jayanandsuri
Raviprabhsuri
Yashodevsuri
Pradyumnasuri
Mandevsuri III
Vimalchandrasuri
Udyotansuri
Sarvadevsuri
Devsuri
Sarvadevsuri II
Yashobhadrasuri
Munichandrasuri
Vadidevsuri
Vijaisinghsuri
Somaprabhsuri
Jagatchandrasuri - Founder of Tapagaccha
Devendrasuri
Vidyanandsuri and Dharmagoshsuri
Somaprabhsuri
Somatilaksuri
Devsundersuri
Somasundersuri
Munisundersuri
Ratnashekharsuri
Lakshmisagarsuri
Sumatisadhusuri
Hemvimalsuri
Anandvimalsuri
Vijay Dansuri
Vijay Hirsuri - One who inspired Akbar 
Vijaysen Suri
Vijaydev suri
Vijaysimhsuri
Vijayprabhavsuri
Satyavijay Gani

See also
 Lineage (Buddhism)
 Religious order

Notes

References
 
 
 
 
 

Asceticism
Religious organisations based in India
Jain organisations
Jain monasticism